Kilmorack Gallery reuses a converted church building for its exhibitions, in a rural location near Beauly in Inverness-shire, Scotland. It was established as a commercial gallery in 1997 after the building was purchased by art dealer Tony Davidson, believing that inspirational art could sit in an inspirational building just as well as in a white cube. By putting on consistently ambitious solo and mixed shows of some of the country’s finest artists and sculptors, Kilmorack Gallery has established itself as one of Scotland’s leading contemporary art galleries.  The success of non-urban, destination galleries like Kilmorack 'has made "remote" more than ever a relative term', wrote art critic Duncan Macmillan of the Scotsman. Davidson and art critic Jan Patience featured on The Janice Forsyth Show in May 2013, speaking about the gallery and the works on exhibition.

Artists showcased include established and emerging Scottish painters and sculptors. These include Ade Adesina, Eduard Bersudsky, Helen Denerley, Sharmanka Kinetic Gallery, Eoghan Bridge, Laurence Broderick, Joyce W. Cairns, Kirstie Cohen, Helen Denerley, Steve Dilworth, Lotte Glob, Janette Kerr, Alan Macdonald, Pinkie Maclure, Peter White and George Wyllie.

On the fifteenth anniversary of Kilmorack Gallery, the art writer Georgina Coburn wrote: 'Kilmorack continues to be one of the most astute galleries in the country in the presentation of new work. It continues to show dynamic and powerful work which successfully challenges expectation. 

The Church of Scotland kirk building was built in 1786, recast in 1835 and became a B listed building in 1971. The building had lain empty for twenty-fire years before changes were made for it to be used as an art gallery. This reuse is cited as one of the more fitting church adaptation. Since 1998 an iconic scrap metal lizard sculpture by Helen Denerley has been displayed on the outside of the gallery.

The memoir CONFESSIONS OF A HIGHLAND ART DEALER (Woodwose Books) was released in September 2022. This is Tony Davidson’s debut novel and describes the history, people, places and philosophy behind Kilmorack Gallery. It was described by the Scotsman as an unexpected page-turner.

References

External links
Kilmorack Gallery Website

Art museums and galleries in Scotland
Category B listed buildings in Highland (council area)